Clayson Henrique da Silva Vieira (born 19 March 1995), simply known as Clayson, is a Brazilian footballer who plays as a left winger for Japanese club V-Varen Nagasaki.

Club career

Early career
Born in Botucatu, São Paulo, Clayson made his senior debuts for União São João in 2012, aged only 16. After scoring one goal in three appearances, he was loaned to Grêmio, returning to youth setup.

Ituano
On 18 February 2013 Clayson joined Ituano, making his debut for the club on 24 March, coming on as a second-half substitute in a 1–2 home loss against Oeste for the Campeonato Paulista championship. He scored his first professional goal on 15 March 2015, netting his side's only in a 1–2 loss at Grêmio Osasco Audax.

Ponte Preta
On 28 August 2015, Clayson signed for Série A club Ponte Preta, on loan until the end of the year. He made his debut in the category on 2 September, replacing Biro-Biro in a 1–2 home loss against Cruzeiro.

On 18 November 2015, Ponte bought Clayson outright, with his new five-year contract being effective the following January. He established himself as a starter for the club during the season, and scored his first top tier goal on 3 June 2016 by netting the second in a 2–1 away win against América Mineiro.

Al-Faisaly
On 30 January 2022, Clayson joined Saudi Arabian club Al-Faisaly.

V-Varen Nagasaki
On 11 July 2022, Clayson joined Japanese club V-Varen Nagasaki.

Career statistics

Honours
Ituano
Campeonato Paulista: 2014

Corinthians
Campeonato Brasileiro Série A: 2017
Campeonato Paulista: 2018, 2019

Bahia
Campeonato Baiano: 2020

Cuiabá
Campeonato Mato-Grossense: 2021

Individual
Campeonato Paulista Best Young Player: 2017

References

External links

1995 births
Living people
Footballers from São Paulo (state)
Brazilian footballers
Association football midfielders
Campeonato Brasileiro Série A players
Campeonato Brasileiro Série D players
Saudi Professional League players
J2 League players
União São João Esporte Clube players
Ituano FC players
Associação Atlética Ponte Preta players
Sport Club Corinthians Paulista players
Esporte Clube Bahia players
Cuiabá Esporte Clube players
Al-Faisaly FC players
V-Varen Nagasaki players
Brazilian expatriate footballers
Expatriate footballers in Saudi Arabia
Expatriate footballers in Japan
Brazilian expatriate sportspeople in Saudi Arabia
Brazilian expatriate sportspeople in Japan
People from Botucatu